The Canadian Vickers Velos was a Canadian twin-engined float-equipped sesquiplane designed and built by Canadian Vickers Limited in 1928. Designed for survey work, it proved difficult to fly and only one was built.

Operator

Royal Canadian Air Force

Specification

See also

References

External links

Floatplanes
1920s Canadian patrol aircraft
Velos
Sesquiplanes
Aircraft first flown in 1928
Twin piston-engined tractor aircraft